Kwassa Kwassa is a soukous album by Kanda Bongo Man, released 1989.

Critical reception
Martin Aston, reviewer of British music newspaper Music Week, left warm and positive overlook on album. He wrote: "Francophone soukous practically defines the genre and energy; entwining, zinging guitars, tight rhythms, honey-sweet choruses, non-stop organic from top to toe." The only thing that he doesn't liked was absence of "helpful sleevenotes" on coverart. Myles Boisen of AllMusic found the music "very uptempo and infectious".

Track listing

Personnel
 Kanda Bongo Man — lead vocals
 Diblo Dibala — lead guitar
 Rigo Star — lead guitar
 Lokassa Ya Mbongo — rhythm guitar
 Pablo Lubadika Porthos — bass guitar
 Ringo Yaya Pezo — drums, percussion
 Ti Jean — drums, percussion

 Evelyn Marlin — backing vocals
 Gena Mandako — backing vocals

References

1989 albums
Kanda Bongo Man albums